Beyond Measure is the fifth album by Jeremy Camp, released on October 31, 2006. It includes the singles, "Tonight", "What It Means" and "Let It Fade".

He recorded this album shortly after marrying his wife, Adrienne. On August 15, 2006, Camp released an EP on iTunes, featuring a song from his new album and a song from his wife, Adrienne's new album, along with an interview about their new albums and talk about their tour. "Tonight", the title song from the EP, is on the new album along with the title song, "Beyond Measure", that was mentioned throughout the interview. Jeremy's younger brother, Jared Camp, plays electric guitar on a few tracks, including "Tonight" and "What It Means".

The album entered the Billboard 200 at No. 29, selling about 31,000 copies in its first week. This was also the album's highest position on the chart. It was certified Gold in April 2010.

Track listing

Personnel 

 Jeremy Camp – lead and backing vocals, acoustic guitar (5, 7, 8, 9), electric guitar (7)
 Aaron Sprinkle – keyboards and programming (1, 2, 10), electric guitar (1, 2), percussion (1, 2, 10)
 Ron Aniello – keyboards (3, 5, 6, 7), acoustic piano (3, 8), electric guitar (3, 6, 8, 9), bass (6), acoustic guitar (7)
 Andy Dodd – keyboards and programming (4, 11), acoustic and electric guitars (4, 11)
 Jared Camp – electric guitar (1, 2, 3, 5, 7, 9)
 Randy Williams – electric guitar (5, 6, 7, 9)
 Lars Katz – electric guitar (10)
 Michael Roe – acoustic guitar (12)
 Marc Byrd – electric guitar (12)
 Matt Woll – bass (1, 2), acoustic guitar (2, 10), electric guitar (2)
 Paul Bushnel – bass (3, 5, 7, 8, 9)
 David J. Carpenter – bass (4, 11)
 Joey Sanchez – drums (1, 2, 10)
 Josh Freese – drums (3, 5, 7, 8, 9)
 Adam Watts – drums (4, 11), additional programming (4, 11)
 Eddie Jackson – drums (6)
 Dennis Holt – drums (12)
 Steve Hindalong – percussion (12)
 Matt Slocum – cello (10, 12), string arrangements (10), bass (12)
 Kris Wilkinson – viola (10)
 David Angell – violin (10)
 David Davidson – violin (10)
 Adrienne Camp – additional backing vocals (4, 6, 8, 12)

Production 
 Tracks #1, 2 & 10 produced and engineered by Aaron Sprinkle; Recorded at Compound Recording Studio (Seattle, WA); Drums recorded at London Bridge Studio (Seattle, WA); Assistant Engineers – Aaron Lipinski, Larz Katz and Franklin Mazzeo; Drum Tech – Aaron Mlasko.
 Tracks #3 & 5-9 produced by Ron Aniello; Recorded at NRG Studios (N. Hollywood, CA) and Flat Out Studios (West Point, IN); Engineered by Eddie Jackson, Clif Norrell and Ron Aniello; Assistant Engineer at NRG – Casey Lewis.
 Tracks #4 & 11 produced and recorded by Andy Dodd and Adam Watts for Red Decibel Productions; Recorded at Red Decibel Studios (Orange County, CA) and Flat Out Studios (West Point, IN); Assistant Engineer at Flat Out – Jared Camp.
 Track #12 produced by Steve Hindalong and Marc Byrd; Recorded by Derri Daugherty at Sled Dog Studio (Franklin, TN).
 Tracks #1, 3 & 5-9 mixed by Tom Lord-Alge at South Beach Studios, assisted by Femio Hernandez.
 Tracks #2, 10 & 12 mixed by Michael Shipley at The Animal House; Assistant and Pro-Tools Editor – Brian Wohlgemuth.
 Tracks #4 & 11 mixed by Chris Lord-Alge at Resonate Music (Burbank, CA), assisted by Nik Karpen.
 Mastered by Brian Gardner at Bernie Grundman Mastering (Hollywood, CA).
 Executive Producer – Brandon Ebel
 A&R – Tyson Paoletti
 Project Coordinator – Jeff Carver
 Art Direction – Invisible Creature, Inc.
 Design – Ryan Clark for Invisible Creature, Inc.
 Photography – Jeremy Cowart
 Management – Matt Balm

Accolades 

In 2007, the album won a Dove Award for Recorded Music Packaging of the Year at the 38th GMA Dove Awards.

References 

2006 albums
Jeremy Camp albums
BEC Recordings albums
Albums produced by Ron Aniello